Nam Sago (1509–1571) was a scholar of the Joseon period of Korea. He was well versed in mechanics 역학(易學), geomancy 풍수(風水), astrology 천문(天文), divination 복서(卜筮) and physiognomy 관상(觀相). In a first part of his adult life, he lived as a wandering scholar, traveling to famous mountains all over the country to detect auspicious sites. Under the name of Gyeogam 격암(格庵), he became known for poems and prose with prophetic intents. In his later years he served as Professor of Astronomy (천문학 교수, rank 6b) at Gwansanggam (觀象監).

Works

Nam Sago is credited with writing the "Secret Predictions of Nam Sago"  남사고비결(南師古秘訣)  as well as the 십승지 "Ten Excellent Sites for Protection and Good Luck [according] to the Geomancy of Nam Gyeoggam". These two texts were included in the compilation known as Jeonggamnok, which was probably collected in the 1600-1650 period.

On the contrary, it has been proven that the so-called Gyeogam Yurok (Nam Sago Prophecies) released in 1977 by Lee Do-eun was just a forgery, written after the events it was supposed to predict.

Appearances in the Records of Joseon Dynasty
During the reign of Seonjo, Nam Sago is quoted as an expert in pungsu (geomancy) 1593-01-12, art.3 (about the fortunes of the sky and fortune-telling) or 1600-07-26, art. 1 (about Selection and Creation of a Burial site). On the contrary, during the reign of Yeongjo 1733-08-18, art. 4, the works of Nam Sago are linked to a criminal case, while 1733-08-26, art. 2 is about banning them for being related to the Gwak Cheo-ung poster case. Indeed, the Joseon court was trying to enforce a separation between the geomancy issued from the approved Chinese texts and the native, politicized, geomancy of Korea.

Sources

 Doopedia 

 EncyKor 

 EncyKor 

 OTD 

 

 Jorgensen: , 451 pages

 , 594 pages

 Kim Hawon , 294 pages

See also
Heo Ho-Ik 2009, analysed at academic.naver

References

16th-century Korean writers
Korean scholars
16th-century Korean astronomers